Let Her Cry (Sinhala: ඇගේ ඇස අග) is a 2016 Sri Lankan  Sinhala romantic drama film directed by Asoka Handagama and produced by Asoka Jagath Wijenayake. It stars Swarna Mallawarachchi, Dritimen Chaterji, Sandali Ash and Rithika Kodithuvakku. Music for the film is done by Chitral Somapala. The movie was screened in November 2015 at the Kolkata International Film Festival.

The film is available to stream on Netflix with a variety of subtitles in 39 countries. The Film won many local awards in Sri Lanka including best film, best director and best actress.

Cast
 Swarna Mallawarachchi
 Dhritiman Chatterjee
 Rithika Kodithuwakku
 Sandali Ash
 Hashinika Karaliyadda
 Thilakshani Rathnayake
 Asoka Zoysa
 King Ratnam
 Keerthi Ranjith Peiris
 Amarapala Karasinghearachchi

Soundtrack

References

External links
මම ලිංගිකත්වය මා(ර්)කට් කරනවද නැද්ද කියන එක වෙනම කතාවක්

2016 films
2016 romantic drama films
Sri Lankan romantic drama films
2010s Sinhala-language films